Northern Foothills is a line of coastal hills on the west side of Terra Nova Bay, Victoria Land, Antarctica, lying southward of Browning Pass and forming a peninsular continuation of the Deep Freeze Range. It was named by the Northern Party of the British Antarctic Expedition, 1910–13, because during field operations Inexpressible Island, close southward, was originally referred to as the "Southern Foothills."

Hills of Victoria Land
Scott Coast